Jan Louis Perkowski (December 29, 1936, Perth Amboy, New Jersey) is a Professor of Slavic Languages and Literatures at the University of Virginia. He has three consecutive degrees including a PhD from Harvard University.  He currently resides in Charlottesville.

He attracted attention when he published research into alleged vampire folklore in the 1970s that was easily sensationalized in the press and has a vogue among vampire fans.

Perkowski wrote about a Kashubian idiolect and was employed by the National Museum of Man in Canada in 1968–9 to conduct research for the Canadian Centre for Folk Culture Studies in the area of Wilno, Ontario, to study Kashubian Polish folklore and traditions. His 1972 report, "Vampires, Dwarves, And Witches Among The Ontario Kashubs" inspired sensational articles in Psychology Today, The Canadian Magazine, and The National Enquirer which got it denounced on the floor of the Canadian House of Commons.

Kashubians in Wilno, Ontario allegedly believe that "the only remedy against this kind of future vampirism was to extract the teeth from the infants. The Kashubs also feared those born with a red caul, a piece of amniotic membrane that naturally surrounds an unborn baby in the womb. 

Perkowski was previously employed at the University of California, Santa Barbara, the University of Texas, Austin, and the University of Virginia, Charlottesville, VA. He taught classes on Slavic languages, diachronic linguistics, the occult and vampires, and courses such as "How to be a Spy." He is now retired.

In 1989, he published The Darkling: A Treatise on Slavic Vampirism which contains original vampire accounts translated into English from over twenty languages, many for the first time, including a vampire trial in Dubrovnik in 1737. The book is currently being added as a chapter in his forthcoming work Vampire Lore. However, he was best known for teaching an undergraduate class called "Dracula", covering vampire mythology in western culture from ancient times to the present.  Perkowski himself approaches the vampire as an outgrowth of the culture in which its legend arose - often more a morality tale than anything else. After his retirement, the course was taken on by his former student Stanley Stepanic, a known noise musician and demonologist.

Publications
1969: A Kashubian Idiolect in the United States
1972: Vampires, Dwarves and Witches Among the Ontario Kashubs. Ottawa, Ontario, Canada : 1972
1976: Vampires of the Slavs. Cambridge, Massachusetts, USA : Slavica, 1976. 
1978: Gusle and Ganga Among the Hercegovinians of Toronto. Ann Arbor, Michigan, USA : University Microfilms International, 1978. 
1982: "The Romanian Folkloric Vampire". East Europe Quarterly, September 1982. Reprinted in The Vampire: A Casebook, Alan Dundes, ed. (University of Wisconsin Press, 1998) 
1989: The Darkling: A Treatise on Slavic Vampirism. Columbus, Ohio, USA : Slavica, 1989.  
2000: Linguistic History Engraved in Gold and Silver: Legends on the Coins of St. Vladimir.
2006: Vampire Lore: From the Writings of Jan Louis Perkowski. Slavica, 2006.

References

External links
Perkowski's website
The Vampire in Ontario - Wilno's Vampiric Legends

Living people
University of Virginia faculty
Harvard University alumni
Vampirism
Year of birth missing (living people)